Scott Wentworth (born 1955) is an American actor and director who immigrated to Canada in 1986.

Early life 
Wentworth was born in Baltimore, Maryland, in 1955.

Career 
After starting his career in New York City, he began a long association with the Stratford Shakespeare Festival in the 1985 production of The Glass Menagerie. He would later perform in a wide variety of roles at Stratford, such as Cliff in Cabaret, the title role in Macbeth, Sky Masterson in Guys and Dolls, Shylock in Merchant of Venice and Tevye in Fiddler on the Roof.  He also directed Henry IV, Part 1 and Henry IV, Part 2 in 2001 and The Adventures of Pericles in 2015.

He returned to New York in 1989 to appear in Welcome to the Club, and received a Tony nomination (Best Performance by a Featured Actor in a Musical). As a director, he has worked at the Indiana Repertory Theatre, the Citadel Theatre in Edmonton, and the Hillberry Theatre in Detroit.

Wentworth has co-written musicals with his wife Marion Adler and composer, Craig Bohmler. Their first collaboration, Gunmetal Blues, has been performed at the George Street Playhouse in New Brunswick, New Jersey, and the Colony Theatre in Burbank, California. Their second collaboration, Enter the Guardsman, based on the Ferenc Molnár play The Guardsman, was nominated for a Laurence Olivier Award (Best Musical) in 1997.

Filmography

Film

Television

References

External links

1955 births
Living people
American male film actors
Male actors from Baltimore
American male Shakespearean actors
American male stage actors